Suleiman Mahmoud al-Obeidi (Arabic: سليمان محمود العبيدي; 1949 - 6 October 2020) was a senior military officer in Libya.

Career
He was formerly a commander in Muammar Gaddafi's army. He was commander of the Tobruk Military Region. He was amongst the first of the army hierarchy to defect to the opposition during the Libyan Civil War. Around half of the estimated 6,000 troops who joined the rebels took their orders from General Mahmoud prior to the 28 July 2011 assassination of General Abdul Fatah Younis, the top commander of the National Liberation Army. The Associated Press reported the next day that Mahmoud succeeded Younis as army commander.

Mahmoud moved his headquarters to Tripoli after the success of Operation Mermaid Dawn. As of early September 2011, he reportedly maintained a separate force from Abdelhakim Belhadj, the head of the Tripoli Military Council, though the two men were ostensibly working to integrate the anti-Gaddafi forces in western Libya into a cohesive military under the aegis of the National Transitional Council.

Death
On 6 October 2020, Mahmoud died from COVID-19 at the age of 71 during the COVID-19 pandemic in Libya.

References

External links
 
 English Aljazeera interview of General Suleiman Mahmoud

1949 births
2020 deaths
Libyan generals
People of the First Libyan Civil War
National Liberation Army (Libya)
Deaths from the COVID-19 pandemic in Libya